Vitaly Mikhailov (born 24 August 1986) is a Belarusian long track speed skater, born in Vitebsk, who participates in international competitions.

Mikhailov is the current holder of the Belorusian record in 1000 metres.

Personal records

Career highlights

European Allround Championships
2006 - Hamar, 21st
2007 - Collalbo, 19th
2008 - Kolomna,  21st
World Junior Allround Championships
2004 - Roseville, Minnesota, 21st
2005 - Seinäjoki, 20th
2006 - Erfurt, 24th
National Championships
2003 - Minsk,  3rd at allround
Nordic Junior Games
2004 - Berlin,  2nd at 3000 m

References

External links
Mikhailov at Jakub Majerski's Speedskating Database
Mikhailov at SkateResults.com

1986 births
Belarusian male speed skaters
Living people
Sportspeople from Vitebsk
Speed skaters at the 2018 Winter Olympics
Olympic speed skaters of Belarus